Bruce G. Hamilton (born c. 1923) was a rugby union player who represented Australia.

Hamilton, a lock, claimed 1 international rugby cap for Australia.

References

Australian rugby union players
Australia international rugby union players
Living people
Year of birth missing (living people)
Rugby union locks